Warázu, also known as Pauserna or Guarasugwé (Guarasú'we), is a moribund Tupi–Guaraní language of Brazil. It was also formerly spoken in Bolivia. It is spoken by the Guarasugwé people, who were estimated to number 125 according to a census in 2012.

Classification
Warázu is most closely related to Sirionó and Yuki (Yuqui). Ramirez (2017) places the classification of Warázu in the Guaraní subgroup of the Tupi-Guarani languages as follows:

Guaraní subgroup
Guaraní
Tupinambá
Guarayu
Warázu-Sirionoid
Sirionoid (Sirionó, Yuqui, etc.)
Warázu

Names
Speakers are also known as Guaraiutá, Guaraju, Pauserna, Guarasugwe, or Warazúkwe [waɾaðúkwe].

Demographics
Ramirez (2017) found only 2 remaining speakers of Warázu, an elderly couple consisting of Känä́tsɨ [kənə́tsɨ] (José Frei Leite) and Híwa (Ernestina Moreno). They were born in Riozinho (Urukuríti) in Rondônia, Brazil, and moved back and forth between Brazil and Bolivia until finally settling in Pimenteiras do Oeste, Rondônia.

Traditionally, the Warázu people had lived in the following 7 villages along the banks of the Guaporé River. However, the Warázu language is no longer spoken in these localities.

Riozinho (Urukurɨ́ti) (on the banks of the Riozinho River, a tributary of the Guaporé River), Brazil
Acurizal, Brazil
Campo Grande (on the banks of the Paragúa River, a tributary of the Guaporé River), Bolivia
Bella Vista, Bolivia
Jangada, Bolivia
Barranco Vermelho, Bolivia
Flechas, Bolivia

Phonology
Phonological inventory of Warázu:

Consonants

Allophones:
[ɲ], allophone of /n/
[ɾʲ], allophone of /ɾ/
[tʲ], allophone of /t/
[ʝ], allophone of /ð/

Vowels

Syllabic structure is (C)V or (C)VV.

Pronouns
Warázu pronouns:

{| class="wikitable"
! pronoun !! Warázu
|-
| I || tsé
|-
| you (sg.) || né [á-pe]
|-
| we (excl.) || óre
|-
| we (incl.) || ðáne
|-
| you (pl.) || pé [peðó-pe]
|-
| he, she || áʔe
|}

Vocabulary
For a list of Warázu plant and animal names from Ramirez (2017), see the corresponding Portuguese article.

Further reading
Anonymous (2015). Diccionario flora y fauna gwarasu. Santa Cruz de la Sierra: Talleres Gráficos Kipus.
Riester, Jürgen (1972). Die Pauserna-Guarasug’wä. Monographie eines Tupi-Guaraní-Volkes in Ostbolivien. St. Augustin bein Bonn: Verlag des Anthropos-Instituts.
Riester, Jürgen (1976). En busca de la Loma Santa. Indígenas en el Oriente Boliviano. Análisis de su situación actual. La Paz: Editorial Los Amigos del Libro.
Riester, Jürgen (1977). Los Guarasug’wé: Crónica de sus últimos días. La Paz: Editorial Los Amigos del Libro.

References

Tupi–Guarani languages
Languages of Brazil
Languages of Bolivia
Extinct languages of South America
Mamoré–Guaporé linguistic area